U18 or U-18 may refer to:
 Geometry 
 Small rhombihexahedron
 Military 
 German submarine U-18, a disambiguation page
 U-18, a Soviet World War II experimental self-propelled gun.

An under-18 youth sport teams or competition, including:

Association football
 :Category:Under-18 association football, one of many under-18 association football (soccer) teams
Basketball
 USA Women's U18 and U19 teams, two of the teams under the auspices of the USA Basketball organization
Ice hockey
 IIHF World U18 Championship, an annual event organized by the International Ice Hockey Federation for national under-18 ice hockey
 the Ivan Hlinka Memorial Tournament, also known as the U-18 Junior World Cup, an annual event for national under-18 ice hockey teams from around the world
Volleyball
 Girl's Africa Volleyball Championship U18,  a sport competition for women's national under-18 volleyball teams, held by theConfédération Africaine de Volleyball, the Africa volleyball federation
 NORCECA Girls Youth Continental Championship U-18, a sport competition for women's national under-18 volleyball teams, held by the North America, Central America and Caribbean volleyball federation
 South America Volleyball Championship U18, a sport competition for national under-18 volleyball teams, held by the Confederación Sudamericana de Voleibol, the South America volleyball federation.